Kadima (Hebrew: קדימה, literally "forward") is a youth group affiliated with the United Synagogue of Conservative Judaism (USCJ), specifically aimed at Jewish preteens living in North America in Grades 6–8. Every USCJ-affiliated synagogue is entitled to a Kadima chapter.

Kadima serves as a "feeder" into United Synagogue Youth (USY), the primary USCJ youth group, aimed at Jewish high-school-aged youth.

Kadima may have been founded by Rabbi Leon S. Lang at Oheb Shalom Congregation in Newark, New Jersey, between 1927 and 1939.

References

External links
 Kadima at usy.org

Conservative Judaism in the United States
Conservative Judaism outreach